William Elliot may refer to:

Politicians
William Elliot of Wells (1701–64), English army officer, courtier and MP
William Elliot (Irish politician) (1766–1818), MP and Chief Secretary for Ireland
William Elliot-Murray-Kynynmound, 3rd Earl of Minto (1814–1891), British Whig politician, MP for Hythe, Greenock, and for Clackmannan and Kinross

Others
William Elliot (rugby union) (1867–1958), New Zealand rugby union footballer
William Elliot (1780–1853), instrument maker in London, founder of the company that became Elliott Brothers
 William Elliot, a fictional character from the 1817 Jane Austen novel Persuasion
 William Elliot (RAF officer) (1896–1971), Royal Air Force commander

See also

Billy Elliot (disambiguation)
William Eliot (disambiguation)
William Elliott (disambiguation)